Álvaro Fabián López Ojeda (born 24 September 1992) is a Chilean former footballer who played as a forward for General Velásquez.

Career
A product of the Cobreloa youth system, López moved to Calama in 2009 at the age of sixteen, and made his professional debut in 2010 in a match against Unión San Felipe. In 2015, he switched to Barnechea.

After stints with Deportes Melipilla and Magallanes, he moved abroad and played for Miami United in the 2018 NPSL, FAS in the 2019 Clausura of the Salvadoran Primera División and the Paraguayan football in second half 2019.
 
After a stint as a free agent (2020–21) in the context of the COVID-19 pandemic, he joined General Velásquez in 2022.

Personal life
After leaving the Paraguayan football at the end of 2019, he started a jewelry shop in Santiago.

References

External links
 

1992 births
Living people
Footballers from Santiago
Chilean footballers
Chilean expatriate footballers
Cobreloa footballers
A.C. Barnechea footballers
Deportes Melipilla footballers
Deportes Magallanes footballers
Magallanes footballers
C.D. FAS footballers
General Velásquez footballers
Chilean Primera División players
Primera B de Chile players
Segunda División Profesional de Chile players
National Premier Soccer League players
Salvadoran Primera División players
Chilean expatriate sportspeople in the United States
Chilean expatriate sportspeople in El Salvador
Chilean expatriate sportspeople in Paraguay
Expatriate footballers in El Salvador
Expatriate soccer players in the United States
Expatriate footballers in Paraguay
Association football forwards